Femi Kuti is the third album by Nigerian musician Femi Kuti released in 1995.  It was released on Motown's Tabu Records label.  The album introduced Femi Kuti and afrobeat to an international audience.

Legacy
The album was included in the book 1001 Albums You Must Hear Before You Die.

Track listing
All songs written by Femi Kuti. All song produced by Andy Lyden and Femi Anikulapo Kuti.

 "Wonder, Wonder" – 6:06
 "Survival" – 8:55
 "Frustrations" – 9:06
 "Nawa (Intro)" – 0:30
 "Nawa" – 8:39
 "Plenty Nonsense" – 9:31
 "Stubborn Problems" – 9:32
 "No Shame" – 6:28
 "Live for Today" – 8:56
 "Changes" – 5:59

See also
Fela Kuti

References

1995 albums
Femi Kuti albums